Manamalai is a 1958 Indian Tamil-language romantic drama film directed by Chitrapu Narayana Rao and written by Vindhan. It is based on the 1914 novel Parineeta by Sarat Chandra Chattopadhyay. The film stars Gemini Ganesan and Savitri. It was released on 14 February 1958, and failed commercially.

Plot 

Shekhar and Lalitha are lovers, but their romance is interrupted by Kumar, a wealthy young man.

Cast 
 Gemini Ganesan
 Savitri
 Sriram
 Chandrababu
 V. Nagayya
 D. Balasubramaniam
 Girija
 M. Mynavathi

Production 
Manamalai, directed by Chitrapu Narayana Rao and written by Vindhan, is based on the novel Parineeta by Sarat Chandra Chattopadhyay. It was produced by Sriram under Janatha Pictures.

Soundtrack 
The soundtrack was composed by Vedha. Lyrics were written by Gopalakrishna Bharati, Saravanabavanandhar, Lakshmanadass, Villiputhan & A. Maruthakasi.

Release and reception 
Manamalai was released on 14 February 1958, and failed commercially.

References

Bibliography

External links 
 

1950s Tamil-language films
1958 films
1958 romantic drama films
Films based on Indian novels
Films based on works by Sarat Chandra Chattopadhyay
Indian black-and-white films
Indian romantic drama films
Films scored by Vedha (composer)